Green Point Christian College is an independent non-denominational Christian co-educational primary and secondary day school, located in Green Point, New South Wales on the Central Coast of New South Wales, Australia. The school provides a religious and general education to approximately 1,100 students from Year K to Year 12.

History
The school was established in 1982 by the Green Point Baptist Church. The principal is Mr Phillip Nash.

Notable students
 Daniel Webber Actor
 Nicola McDermott  Olympic Athlete

See also

 List of non-government schools in New South Wales

References

External links
 Official website

Educational institutions established in 1982
Private primary schools in New South Wales
Nondenominational Christian schools in New South Wales
1982 establishments in Australia
Private secondary schools in Sydney
Central Coast (New South Wales)